Laser guidance directs a robotics system to a target position by means of a laser beam. The laser guidance of a robot is accomplished by projecting a laser light, image processing and communication to improve the accuracy of guidance. The key idea is to show goal positions to the robot by laser light projection instead of communicating them numerically. This intuitive interface simplifies directing the robot while the visual feedback improves the positioning accuracy and allows for implicit localization. The guidance system may serve also as a mediator for cooperative multiple robots.
Examples of proof-of-concept experiments of directing a robot by a laser pointer are shown on video.
Laser guidance spans areas of robotics, computer vision, user interface, video games, communication and smart home technologies.

Commercial systems 

Samsung Electronics Co., Ltd. may have been using this technology in robotic vacuum cleaners since 2014.  

Google Inc. applied for a patent with USPTO on using visual light or laser beam between devices to represent connections and interactions between them (Appl. No. 13/659,493, Pub. No. 2014/0363168).
However, no patent was granted to Google on this application.

Military use 

Laser guidance is used by military to guide a missile or other projectile or vehicle to a target by means of a laser beam, either beam riding guidance or semi-active laser homing (SAL). This technique is sometimes called SALH, for Semi-Active Laser Homing. With this technique, a laser is kept pointed at the target and the laser radiation bounces off the target and is scattered in all directions (this is known as "painting the target", or "laser painting"). The missile, bomb, etc. is launched or dropped somewhere near the target. When it is close enough for some of the reflected laser energy from the target to reach it, a laser seeker detects which direction this energy is coming from and adjusts the projectile trajectory towards the source. While the projectile is in the general area and the laser is kept aimed at the target, the projectile should be guided accurately to the target. However, SALH is not useful against targets that do not reflect much laser energy, including those coated in special paint which absorbs laser energy. This is likely to be widely used by advanced military vehicles in order to make it harder to use laser designators against them and harder to hit them with laser-guided munitions. An obvious circumvention would be to merely aim the laser close to the target. Countermeasures to laser guidance are laser detection systems, smoke screen, anti-laser active protection systems.

See also
 Guidance system
 Laser rangefinder
 List of laser articles
 List of laser applications

References 

Robot navigation
Missile guidance
Laser applications